Nordine Taleb (born June 10, 1981) is a French-Canadian professional mixed martial artist. He is currently signed in the Welterweight division of the ARES FC. A professional since 2007, he has also competed for Bellator MMA and Ultimate Fighting Championship for 6 years.

Mixed martial arts career

Early career
Taleb began his professional career with a unanimous decision victory, before losing his next bout via TKO. After a further four victories across Canada, Taleb fought Pete Sell at Ring of Combat 38 for Sell's welterweight championship. Taleb was the much quicker man and was able to move in and out of range quickly, which reduced the amount of strikes he took from Sell. In the second round, Taleb hit Sell with a counter right hand, followed by strikes on the ground. The referee stopped the fight early in the second round and Taleb was declared the ROC Welterweight Champion.

Bellator
In 2011, Taleb was signed by Bellator and made his debut at Bellator 64 against Matt Secor. Taleb dominated the fight and outclassed Secor enough to be awarded 10-8 rounds by one judge. Taleb was able to take Secor down multiple times and also controlled the stand-up portion of the fight. Taleb won via unanimous decision (30-27, 30-27, 30-24).

Taleb's second fight for Bellator was against Matt MacGrath, which was held as a 180lb. Catchweight bout, due to the fight being contested at short notice. Taleb controlled MacGrath in the opening round, by utilising his reach advantage via straight punches. MacGrath started to come back into the fight in the second round, but was knocked down by a left hand from Taleb. Taleb hit MacGrath with some follow-up shots and was declared the winner via TKO.

Taleb was then entered into the Bellator Season Seven Welterweight Tournament. Taleb's opponent in the quarterfinal was the first-and-only DREAM welterweight champion Marius Žaromskis. Taleb lost via unanimous decision.

The Ultimate Fighter
In December 2013, it was announced that Taleb was selected as one of the fighters to represent Canada for the upcoming The Ultimate Fighter Nations: Canada vs. Australia.  In his first fight on the show, Taleb lost to Tyler Manawaroa via unanimous decision after three rounds.

In a rare move, the UFC revealed in March 2014 that Taleb would also appear as a participant on the next season of the show, The Ultimate Fighter: Team Edgar vs. Team Penn. Taleb lost his preliminary fight to get into the house against Mike King via decision after a sudden victory round.

Ultimate Fighting Championship
Despite being announced as a participant on The Ultimate Fighter: Team Edgar vs. Team Penn, Taleb appeared on the event leading up to its premiere as he faced fellow contestant Vik Grujic at The Ultimate Fighter Nations Finale. He won the bout via unanimous decision.

Taleb faced Li Jingliang on October 4, 2014 at UFC Fight Night: MacDonald vs. Saffiedine. He won the fight via split decision and marked a successful return to welterweight.

Taleb was expected to face Cláudio Silva on April 25, 2015 at UFC 186. However, Silva was forced out of the bout with a broken foot and replaced by Chris Clements. Taleb won the fight by unanimous decision.

Taleb faced Warlley Alves on August 1, 2015 at UFC 190. He lost the fight by submission in the second round.

Taleb faced Erick Silva on March 5, 2016 at UFC 196. He won the fight via knockout in the second round.

Taleb was expected to face Alan Jouban on July 7, 2016 at UFC Fight Night 90. However, Taleb pulled out of the bout in early June citing an injury.

Taleb faced Santiago Ponzinibbio on February 19, 2017 at UFC Fight Night 105. He lost the fight by unanimous decision.

Taleb was expected to face Emil Weber Meek on 28 May 2017 at UFC Fight Night 109. However, Meek pulled out of the fight on May 12 citing injury. Meek was replaced by promotional newcomer Oliver Enkamp. He won the fight by unanimous decision.

Taleb was expected to face Sultan Aliev on 16 December 2017 at UFC on FOX 26. However, Aliev was removed from the card for undisclosed reasons in early December and was replaced by Danny Roberts. Taleb won the last bout of his contract by knockout in the first round. This win earned him the Performance of the Night bonus.

Taleb  faced Cláudio Silva on 27 May 2018 at UFC Fight Night 130.  He lost the fight via a rear-naked choke in the first round.

Taleb faced Sean Strickland on 27 October 2018 at UFC Fight Night 138. He lost the fight via technical knockout in the second round.

Taleb was scheduled to face Siyar Bahadurzada on 4 May 2019 at UFC Fight Night: Iaquinta vs. Cowboy.  However, it was reported on April 24, 2019 that Bahadurzada pulled out of the bout citing injury, and he is replaced by newcomer Kyle Prepolec. Taleb won the fight via unanimous decision.

Taleb faced Muslim Salikhov on September 7, 2019 at UFC 242. He lost the fight via knockout in round one.

Post-UFC career
After being released by the UFC, Taleb was expected to headline ARES 2 on April 3, 2020, against Maarten Wouters. However, due to the COVID-19 pandemic, the event was postponed until October 30, 2020.

Championships and achievements

Ultimate Fighting Championship
Performance of the Night (One time) vs. Danny Roberts

Mixed martial arts record

|-
|Loss
|align=center|15–7
|Muslim Salikhov
|KO (punch)
|UFC 242 
|
|align=center|1
|align=center|4:26
|Abu Dhabi, United Arab Emirates
| 
|-
|Win
|align=center|15–6
|Kyle Prepolec
|Decision (unanimous)
|UFC Fight Night: Iaquinta vs. Cowboy 
|
|align=center|3
|align=center|5:00
|Ottawa, Ontario, Canada
|  
|-
|Loss
|align=center| 14–6
|Sean Strickland
|TKO (punches)
|UFC Fight Night: Volkan vs. Smith 
|
|align=center|2
|align=center|3:10
|Moncton, New Brunswick, Canada
|
|-
|Loss
|align=center|14–5
|Cláudio Silva
|Submission (rear-naked choke)
|UFC Fight Night: Thompson vs. Till
|
|align=center|1
|align=center|4:31
|Liverpool, England
|
|- 
|Win
|align=center|14–4
|Danny Roberts
|KO (head kick and punch)
|UFC on Fox: Lawler vs. dos Anjos 
|
|align=center|1
|align=center|0:59
|Winnipeg, Manitoba, Canada
|
|-
|Win
|align=center|13–4
|Oliver Enkamp
|Decision (unanimous)
|UFC Fight Night: Gustafsson vs. Teixeira
|
|align=center|3
|align=center|5:00
|Stockholm, Sweden
|
|-
|Loss
|align=center|12–4
|Santiago Ponzinibbio
|Decision (unanimous)
|UFC Fight Night: Lewis vs. Browne
|
|align=center|3
|align=center|5:00
|Halifax, Nova Scotia, Canada
|
|-
|Win
|align=center|12–3
|Erick Silva
| KO (punch)
|UFC 196
|
|align=center|2
|align=center|1:34
|Las Vegas, Nevada, United States
|
|-
|Loss
|align=center|11–3
|Warlley Alves
|Submission (guillotine choke)
|UFC 190
|
|align=center|2
|align=center|4:11
|Rio de Janeiro, Brazil
|
|-
|Win
|align=center|11–2
|Chris Clements
|Decision (unanimous)
|UFC 186
|
|align=center|3
|align=center|5:00
|Montreal, Quebec, Canada
|
|-
|Win
|align=center|10–2
|Li Jingliang
|Decision (split)
|UFC Fight Night: MacDonald vs. Saffiedine
|
|align=center| 3
|align=center| 5:00
|Halifax, Nova Scotia, Canada
|Return to Welterweight.
|-
|Win
|align=center|9–2
|Vik Grujic
|Decision (unanimous)
|The Ultimate Fighter Nations Finale: Bisping vs. Kennedy
|
|align=center| 3
|align=center| 5:00
|Quebec City, Quebec, Canada
|
|-
|Loss
|align=center|8–2
|Marius Žaromskis
|Decision (unanimous)
|Bellator 74
|
|align=center|3
|align=center|5:00
|Atlantic City, New Jersey, United States
|
|-
|Win
|align=center|8–1
|Matt MacGrath
|TKO (punches)
|Bellator 67
|
|align=center|2
|align=center|2:30
|Rama, Ontario, Canada
|
|-
|Win
|align=center|7–1
|Matt Secor
|Decision (unanimous)
|Bellator 64
|
|align=center|3
|align=center|5:00
|Windsor, Ontario, Canada
|
|-
|Win
|align=center|6–1
|Pete Sell
|TKO (punches)
|Ring of Combat 38
|
|align=center|2
|align=center|0:53
|Atlantic City, New Jersey, United States
|
|-
|Win
|align=center|5–1
|Szymon Boniecki
|TKO (punches)
|UGC 28: Montreal
|
|align=center|1
|align=center|1:52
|Montreal, Quebec, Canada
|
|-
|Win
|align=center|4–1
|John Salgado
|KO (head kick)
|Eye of the Tiger
|
|align=center|1
|align=center|2:50
|Montreal, Quebec, Canada
|
|-
|Win
|align=center|3–1
|Chad Cox
|Decision (unanimous)
|W-1 MMA 6: New Ground
|
|align=center|3
|align=center|5:00
|Halifax, Nova Scotia, Canada
|
|-
|Win
|align=center|2–1
|Dean Martins
|TKO (punches)
|W-1 MMA 4: Bad Blood
|
|align=center|2
|align=center|2:54
|Montreal, Quebec, Canada
|
|-
|Loss
|align=center|1–1
|Guillaume DeLorenzi
|TKO (punches)
|XMMA 3: Ring Extreme
|
|align=center|3
|align=center|3:46
|Victoriaville, Quebec, Canada
|
|-
|Win
|align=center|1–0
|Louis-Philippe Carles
|Decision (unanimous)
|XMMA 2: Gold Rush
|
|align=center|3
|align=center|5:00
|Victoriaville, Quebec, Canada
|

Mixed martial arts exhibition record

| Loss
|align=center| 0–2
| Mike King
| Decision (unanimous)
| The Ultimate Fighter: Team Edgar vs. Team Penn
|April 16, 2014 (airdate)
|align=center|3
|align=center|5:00
|Las Vegas, Nevada, United States
| 
|-
|Loss
|align=center| 0–1
| Tyler Manawaroa
| Decision (unanimous)
| The Ultimate Fighter Nations: Canada vs. Australia
|February 7, 2014 (airdate)
|align=center|3
|align=center|5:00
|Quebec City, Quebec, Canada
|

See also
 List of current UFC fighters
 List of male mixed martial artists
 List of Canadian UFC fighters

References

External links
 
 

1981 births
Living people
French male mixed martial artists
French sportspeople of Algerian descent
French practitioners of Brazilian jiu-jitsu
People from Saint-Tropez
Middleweight mixed martial artists
Welterweight mixed martial artists
Sportspeople from Var (department)
Ultimate Fighting Championship male fighters
Mixed martial artists utilizing Brazilian jiu-jitsu